The Demics were a Canadian punk rock band that formed in 1977 in London, Ontario.

Biography
Originally formed in London, Ontario in 1977, the band consisted of vocalist Keith Whittaker, guitarist Rob Brent, bassist Iain Atkinson-Staines and drummer James Weatherstone. Through 1978, the band were rising stars in the Canadian punk scene. They recorded their debut EP in the fall of that year, and subsequently moved to Toronto to be closer to the centre of the punk scene. The EP's single, "New York City" released on Ready Records, was the band's breakthrough hit on CFNY in 1979.

Brent left the band and went on to form the post punk/new wave band, "Mettle" as guitarist and synth player.  Brent was replaced by Steve Koch in the Demics. The band released a self-titled full-length album in 1980, but subsequently broke up due to internal tensions.

In 1996, a new CD compiling both of the band's original albums titled New York City was released domestically on Huge Records. Also that year, "New York City" was named the greatest Canadian song of all time in a reader poll by the music magazine Chart.

Vocalist Keith Whittaker died of cancer on July 16, 1996. Guitarist Rob Brent died of a heart condition on November 5, 2014 at the age of 57. Drummer James Weatherstone died in his sleep on July 18, 2021 at the age of 63.

Discography
1979:  Talk's Cheap
1980:  The Demics
1981:  The 400 Blows
1996:  New York City

See also

Music of Canada
Canadian punk rock
List of bands from Canada

References

External links
 Keith Whittaker solo album at Bullseye Records
 Keith Whittaker at MySpace

Canadian punk rock groups
Musical groups from Toronto
Musical groups established in 1977
Musical groups disestablished in 1980
1996 in Canadian music
1977 establishments in Ontario
1980 disestablishments in Ontario